This is a list of primary and secondary schools located in the South American country of Brazil.  The list is organized by city. Tertiary schools are presented separately on the list of universities in Brazil by state.

Belo Horizonte
Schools in the city of Belo Horizonte, Minas Gerais, include:

 American School of Belo Horizonte
 St. John's Academy

Brasília
Schools in the city of Brasília, Federal District, include:

 American School of Brasília
 Brasilia International School
 School of the Nations (Escola das Nações)

Curitiba
Schools in the city of Curitiba, Paraná, include:

 International School of Curitiba

Porto Alegre
Schools in the city of Porto Alegre, Rio Grande do Sul, include:

 Pan American School of Porto Alegre

Recife
Schools in the city of Recife, Pernambuco, include:

 American School of Recife

Rio de Janeiro

Schools in the city of Rio de Janeiro, Rio de Janeiro, include:

 American School of Rio (Escola Americana do Rio de Janeiro)
 The British School of Rio de Janeiro
 International Center for Integrated Education (Centro Internacional de Educação Integrada)
 Our Lady of Mercy School

Salvador
Schools in the city of Salvador, Bahia, include:

 Pan American School of Bahia
 Colégio Versailles

Santos
Schools in the city of Santos, São Paulo, include:

 American School of Santos

São Paulo
Schools in the city of São Paulo, São Paulo, include:

 Ace Language School
 Associação Escola Graduada de São Paulo (also known as the Graded School)
 Colégio Bandeirantes de São Paulo
 Colégio Marista Arquidiocesano
 Escola Maria Imaculada (also known as the Chapel School)
 Fundação Armando Alvares Penteado
 Pan American Christian Academy
 St. Francis Xavier College
 St Paul's School
 St. Nicholas School
 Scuola Italiana Eugenio Montale

See also

 Education in Brazil
 Lists of schools

Schools
Schools
Schools
Brazil
Brazil